Aldo Bulzoni (born 25 August 1942) is an Italian politician and professor.

He is current member of the Independent Party. He has served as Mayor of Caserta from 1993 to 1997. He was nominated for the 1993 administration as an Independent. He was elected mayor of Caserta.

Biography
Aldo Bulzoni was born in Palermo, Italy on 1942. He was diocesan president of Catholic Action in Caserta. He was a high school teacher. He worked at the catholic high school as a physics teacher.

See also
 List of mayors of Caserta

References

External links
 Aldo Bulzoni on radioradicale.it
 Aldo Bulzoni on amministratori.interno.gov.it.

Living people
1942 births
Independent politicians in Italy
21st-century Italian politicians
20th-century Italian politicians
Mayors of Caserta
Politicians from Palermo